Cherelle Thompson (born 14 May 1992) is a Trinidad and Tobago swimmer.

Career 

In 2011, she competed in the women's 50 metre freestyle event at the World Aquatics Championships held in Shanghai, China. She did not advance to compete in the semi-finals.

She represented Trinidad and Tobago at the 2019 World Aquatics Championships held in Gwangju, South Korea. She competed in the women's 50 metre freestyle event. She did not advance to compete in the semi-finals.

She competed in the women's 50 metre freestyle event at the 2020 Summer Olympics held in Tokyo, Japan.

Personal life 

She studied at the University of Tennessee in Knoxville, Tennessee, United States.

References

External links 
 

1992 births
Living people
Place of birth missing (living people)
Trinidad and Tobago female swimmers
University of Tennessee alumni
Swimmers at the 2020 Summer Olympics
Olympic swimmers of Trinidad and Tobago
Tennessee Volunteers women's swimmers
Swimmers at the 2010 Commonwealth Games
Swimmers at the 2022 Commonwealth Games
Commonwealth Games competitors for Trinidad and Tobago
Swimmers at the 2007 Pan American Games
Pan American Games competitors for Trinidad and Tobago